EAPS can mean:
 Ethernet Automatic Protection Switching
 European Association for Population Studies
 Ethnic Affairs Priorities Statement
 Euro Alliance of Payment Schemes
 European Academy of Paediatric Societies
 The Department of Earth, Atmospheric, and Planetary Sciences in the Massachusetts Institute of Technology School of Science
 and, by extension, the Green Building (MIT) that contains that department